Parides quadratus is a species of butterfly in the family Papilionidae. It is found in Brazil and Peru.

Description

Forewing long; hindwing in both sexes with a band consisting of yellowish-white spots on the disc close to the cell, and on the under surface in addition with a red spot at the hind angle. In the name-typical form quadratus the forewing has a yellowish-white spot before the second median. In spoliatus Staudinger neither sex has a spot on the forewing.

Taxonomy

Parides quadratus is a member of the chabrias species group

The members are
Parides chabrias 
Parides coelus 
Parides hahneli 
Parides mithras 
Parides pizarro 
Parides quadratus

Status
A rare species.

Subspecies
Parides quadratus quadratus (Brazil: eastern Amazonas)
Parides quadratus spoliatus (Staudinger, 1898) (Brazil: western Amazonas, northern Peru)

References

quadratus
Butterflies described in 1890
Papilionidae of South America